KNGT (99.5 FM, "Gator 99.5") is a radio station licensed to Lake Charles, Louisiana, United States, broadcasting a country music format. The station is currently owned by Townsquare Media. The station is home to Mike Soileau and Chad Austin in the Morning, Middays with Jess, and Buddy Russ in the Afternoon. KNGT is one of three country stations in Lake Charles.  The station broadcasts from the KVHP TV tower 5 miles northwest of Edgerly, and its studios are located northwest of downtown Lake Charles.

The station adopted the country format in 2002 as K-BIG 99 with call letters KBXG. In 2005 the station switched to gator 99.5 with call letters KNGT. From 1985 to 2002 the station had an adult contemporary format as LA 99 with call letters KHLA.

References

External links

Country radio stations in the United States
NGT
Townsquare Media radio stations
Radio stations established in 1965
1965 establishments in Louisiana